The Almaty City Mäslihat is a local unicameral legislative branch in the city of Almaty. It is led by the current Secretary, Stanislav Kankurov (Amanat).

Composition 
Mäslihat members are generally up for re-election every 5 years and they are elected on the basis of party-list proportional representation with a required 7% electoral threshold to win any seats in the legislature. If only one parties manages to bypass the electoral threshold, then the party win the second highest number of votes is granted enough seats for representation in the mäslihat regardless whether it had passed the threshold or not. A member of the mäslihat may be a citizen of Kazakhstan who has reached 20 years of age and can be a member of only one mäslihat.

History 
The Almaty City Mäslihat was established on the 10th of December1993 after the Supreme Soviet of Kazakhstan adopted the law "On local representative and executive bodies of the Republic of Kazakhstan", which made significant changes to the name and structure of local state bodies including to the city of Almaty itself. The city held the elections on 10 March 1994 to elect the councillors of the 1st convocation of the Mäslihat. The Almaty City Mäslihat was composed of 37 councillors who are represented by single-member constituency and were elected by a secret ballot every 5 years according to the Clause 2 of Article 86 of the Constitution of Kazakhstan, Section VIII "Local state government and self-government". On 23 May 2018, it was announced that all members of mäslihat bodies will be elected through proportional representation. The law was enacted in June 2018.

On the 10th of January 2021, the elections for the 39 councillors of the City Mäslihat was held for the first time where the councillors were elected based on party-list. The Nur Otan won majority of 29 seats followed by 3 minor parties. The 7th Convocation of the Almaty City Mäslihat convened on 15 January where Stanislav Kankurov was elected to be the secretary.

Commissions 
The City Mäslihat includes 7 commissions which are:

 Strategic Planning, Budget and Performance
 Development of Transport and Utilities Infrastructure
 Urban Development, Housing and Land Use
 Development of Entrepreneurship, Innovation, Information Technology and Creative Industry
 Local Governance and Security
 Social and Cultural development, Youth and Public Communications
Ecology, Tourism and Development of Public Spaces

References 

Almaty
1993 establishments in Kazakhstan